Allium abramsii is a species of wild onion known by the common name Abrams' onion.

Description 
Allium abramsii grows from one or more bulbs each just over a centimeter wide attached to a thick rhizome. It reaches a maximum height of about 15 centimeters with usually one curving cylindrical leaf that may be up to a foot long. The inflorescence contains up to 40 pink or purplish flowers with lance-shaped tepals and yellow anthers.

Taxonomy
The epithet abramsii commemorates LeRoy Abrams.

Distribution and habitat 
Allium abramsii is endemic to the central Sierra Nevada in California, where it grows in the coniferous forest understory in granite sand soils. It is found in Fresno, Madera and Tulare Counties at elevations of 1400–2000 m.

References

External links 
 Jepson Manual Treatment – Allium abramsii
 USDA Plants Profile-Allium abramsii
 Allium abramsii Photo gallery

abramsii
Endemic flora of California
Flora of the Sierra Nevada (United States)
Onions
Plants described in 1972